Sir Gerald Fitzroy Hohler KC (29 August 1862 – 30 January 1934) was a British barrister and Conservative Party politician who served as a Member of Parliament (MP) for constituencies in Kent from 1910 to 1929.

He was born in Banstead, Surrey, the fourth son of Henry Booth Hohler and Henrietta Wilhelmina Lawes. His younger brother was diplomat Sir Thomas Hohler. Hohler was educated at Eton and Trinity College, Cambridge. He was called to the bar in 1888 at the Inner Temple, and practised on the South-Eastern Circuit.
He became a King's Counsel (KC) in 1906.

Political career
Hohler was elected at the January 1910 general election as the MP for Chatham, unseating the town's first Labour Party MP John Jenkins, and held the seat until the 1918 general election, when he was elected instead as a Coalition Conservative for the new Gillingham division of Rochester. He was returned to the House of Commons at a further three elections before standing down at the 1929 general election, having been knighted in 1924 in the resignation honours of Stanley Baldwin.

He died in Stansted, Kent, following an operation.

References

External links

1862 births
1934 deaths
People from Banstead
People educated at Eton College
Alumni of Trinity College, Cambridge
Conservative Party (UK) MPs for English constituencies
UK MPs 1910
UK MPs 1910–1918
UK MPs 1918–1922
UK MPs 1922–1923
UK MPs 1923–1924
UK MPs 1924–1929
Members of the Inner Temple
Knights Bachelor
20th-century King's Counsel